The 2006 Campeonato Nacional Clausura Copa Banco del Estado  was the 80th Chilean League top flight, in which Colo-Colo won its 25th league title after beating Audax Italiano in the finals.

Qualifying stage

Scores

Group standings

Group A

Group B

Group C

Group D

Aggregate table

Repechaje

Playoffs

Relegation table

Promotion/relegation playoffs
Lota Schwager reached its promotion to Primera División after beating Rangers in the 2nd leg match’s penalty shoot-out at Coronel. Whilst Palestino remained in the top level after beating Arturo Fernández Vial 3–1 in Concepción and 1–0 in La Cisterna, Santiago.

Top goalscorers

References

External links
RSSSF Chile 2006

Primera División de Chile seasons
Chile
Clausura